William Douglas Hyslop (March 22, 1951 – September 11, 2022) was an American attorney who served as the United States attorney for the Eastern District of Washington from 2019 to 2021. He previously served in the position from 1991 to 1993.

Education 

Hyslop received his Bachelor of Arts from Washington State University, his Master of Public Administration from the University of Washington, and his Juris Doctor from the Gonzaga University School of Law.

Legal career 

Hyslop served as Principal in the Spokane, Washington, office of Lukins & Annis PS, where his practice focused on complex commercial and business litigation in the state and federal courts.

U.S. attorney for the Eastern District of Washington

1991–1993 term 
Hyslop previously served as the U.S. attorney for the Eastern District of Washington from 1991 to 1993.

Nomination as U.S. attorney in 2019

On May 3, 2019, President Donald Trump announced his intent to nominate Hyslop to be the United States attorney for the Eastern District of Washington. On May 13, 2019, his nomination was sent to the United States Senate. On June 13, 2019, his nomination was reported out of committee by voice vote. On June 27, 2019, his nomination was confirmed by voice vote. He was sworn in on July 19, 2019.

On February 8, 2021, he along with 55 other Trump-era attorneys were asked to resign. On February 11, he announced his resignation, effective February 28, 2021.

Memberships 

Hyslop previously served as president of the Washington State Bar Association and Federal Bar Association for the Eastern District of Washington.

Personal life and death 

Hyslop died on September 11, 2022, aged 71.

References

External links
 Biography at U.S. Attorney's Office

1951 births
2022 deaths
20th-century American lawyers
21st-century American lawyers
Evans School of Public Policy and Governance alumni
Gonzaga University School of Law alumni
United States Attorneys for the Eastern District of Washington
Washington (state) lawyers
Washington (state) Republicans
Washington State University alumni